Aldea Island is the central of the three Bugge Islands, off Wordie Ice Shelf, Fallières Coast, Antarctic Peninsula. The island was named Isla Aldea by the Chilean Antarctic Expedition, 1947, probably after Sargento Juan de Dios Aldea, of the Chilean Navy, one of the heroes of the naval battle of Iquique, May 21, 1879.

See also 
 Composite Antarctic Gazetteer
 List of Antarctic islands south of 60° S
 SCAR
 Territorial claims in Antarctica

References
 

Islands of Graham Land
Fallières Coast